The 2016 Vanderbilt Commodores football team represented Vanderbilt University during the 2016 NCAA Division I FBS football season. The Commodores played their home games at Vanderbilt Stadium at Dudley Field in Nashville, Tennessee and competed in the Eastern Division of the Southeastern Conference (SEC). They were led by third-year head coach Derek Mason. This was Vanderbilt's 126th season of college football. They finished the season 6–7, 3–5 in SEC play to finish in a tie for fifth place in the Eastern Division. They were invited to the Independence Bowl where they lost to NC State.

Schedule
Vanderbilt announced its 2016 football schedule on October 29, 2015. The 2016 schedule consisted of six home and six away games in the regular season. The Commodores host SEC foes Florida, Ole Miss, South Carolina, and Tennessee, and traveled to Auburn, Georgia, Kentucky, and Missouri.

The Commodores hosted two of its four of its non–conference games, which were against Georgia Tech Yellow Jackets from the Atlantic Coast Conference, Middle Tennessee and Western Kentucky (WKU) both from Conference USA, and Tennessee State from the Ohio Valley Conference.

Schedule Source:

Coaching staff

Coaching changes
On December 15, 2015, coach Mason announced that special teams coach Charles Bankins, OL Coach Keven Lightner will not be retained for 2016. Mason cited a difference in philosophy rather than poor performance for the coaching changes.

"I just see this football team moving in a different direction and I just wanted to make sure these men were treated the right way," Mason said. "I feel like it’s time for us to move forward."

Recruiting

Game summaries

South Carolina

Middle Tennessee

Georgia Tech

WKU

Florida

Kentucky

Georgia

Tennessee State

Auburn

Vanderbilt's November 5 meeting with Auburn at Jordan-Hare stadium was notable for eventual All-American LB Zach Cunningham's blocked FG in the fourth quarter. Auburn's Daniel Carlson lined up to kick a 35-yard field goal with 1:45 left in the fourth quarter to give the Tigers a 10-point lead. Cunningham, who after the game described watching special teams tape to learn the snap timing of the field goal team, leaped over Auburn's offensive line between the center and left guard to block Carlson's kick. Although Vanderbilt turned the ball over on the ensuing possession to seal Auburn's victory, the play became iconic for Cunningham during his redshirt junior season.

Missouri

Ole Miss

Tennessee

Vanderbilt's 45–34 win over the Tennessee Volunteers represented the Commodores' 6th win on the season, guaranteeing Vanderbilt's eligibility for Bowl play for the first time since 2013, and the first time during Mason's tenure as Vanderbilt's Head Coach. Prior to this game, which was played at Vanderbilt Stadium on November 26, Vanderbilt's high Academic Performance Index (API) introduced the possibility of bowl play even with a 5–7 season end record, as the 5–7 teams with the best API are rewarded with bowl appearances.

However, Vanderbilt avoided dependence upon the API and defeated state rival Tennessee, also for the first time since 2013. Kyle Shurmur led Vanderbilt in a breakout performance with 412 passing yards, and Ralph Webb eclipsed Zac Stacy's school record for career rushing yards. Vanderbilt outscored Tennessee 21–3 in the second half and iced the victory with a touchdown rush from Webb late in the fourth quarter.

NC State–Independence Bowl

References

Vanderbilt
Vanderbilt Commodores football seasons
Vanderbilt Commodores football